"Ships in the Night" is a 1973 song by Vicki Lawrence, an American pop music singer, actress, and comedienne. It was the first of two singles included on her 1974 Ships in the Night LP.  It is a waltz done in 3/4 time.

The song reached No. 7 on the Australian Kent Music Report.  It peaked at No. 18 in New Zealand.  In the United States it hit No. 49 on the Adult Contemporary chart.

"Ships in the Night" was included on the compilation album, Explosive Hits 74.  The B-side, "Sensual Man," is a track from Lawrence's previous LP, The Night the Lights Went Out in Georgia.

Chart performance

Weekly charts

Year-end charts

References

External links
 Lyrics of this song 
 

1973 singles
Vicki Lawrence songs
Bell Records singles
Song recordings produced by Snuff Garrett
1973 songs
Songs written by Bobby Russell